The Acobamba Province is the smallest of seven provinces located in the Department of Huancavelica of Peru. The capital of this province is the city of Acobamba.

Boundaries
North: Churcampa Province
East: Ayacucho Region
South: Angaraes Province
West: Huancavelica Province

Political division
The province is divided into eight districts, which are:

 Acobamba (Acobamba)
 Andabamba (Andabamba)
 Anta (Anta)
 Caja (Caja)
 Marcas (Marcas)
 Paucará (Paucará)
 Pomacocha (Pomacocha)
 Rosario (Rosario)

Ethnic groups 
The people in the province are mainly Indigenous citizens of Quechua descent. Quechua is the language which the majority of the population (85.93%) learnt to speak in childhood, 13.83 	% of the residents started speaking using the Spanish language (2007 Peru Census).

See also 
 Killa Mach'ay

Sources

External links
  Official municipal website

Provinces of the Huancavelica Region